This article lists the winners and nominees for the Black Reel Award for Outstanding Original Score. This award is given to the film composers and was first awarded during the 2005 ceremony. Michael Abels & Nicholas Britell currently holds the record for most wins in this category.

Winners and nominees
Winners are listed first and highlighted in bold.

2000s

2010s

2020s

Multiple nominations and wins

Multiple wins
 2 Wins
 Michael Abels
 Nicholas Britell

Multiple nominations
 7 Nominations
 Terence Blanchard

 4 nominations 
 Ludwig Göransson

 3 nominations 
 Atticus Ross

 2 Nominations
 Michael Abels
 Kathryn Bostic
 Stanley Clarke
 Nicholas Britell
 Robert Glasper
 Devonté Hynes
 Mark Isham
 Trent Reznor
 Dan Romer
 Marcelo Zarvos
 Aaron Zigman
 Hans Zimmer

References

Black Reel Awards